The following lists events that happened during 2001 in the Republic of Rwanda.

Incumbents 
 President: Paul Kagame 
 Prime Minister: Bernard Makuza

Events

March
 March 12 - Uganda is accused of harbouring anti-Rwandan elements starting a feud between the two countries.

References

 
2000s in Rwanda
Years of the 21st century in Rwanda
Rwanda
Rwanda